Neosebastinae, the gurnard scorpionfishes or gurnard perches, is a small subfamily of deep-sea ray-finned fishes, it is part of the family Scorpaenidae. These fishes are found in the Indian and Pacific oceans.  Several of the species in this family are venomous.

Taxonomy
Neosebastinae, or the family Neosebastidae, were first described as a taxon by the Japanese ichthyologist Kiyomatsu Matsubara in 1943. The grouping is treated as a subfamily of the Scorpaenidae within the order Scorpaeniformes by the 5th Edition of Fishes of the World. However, other authorities, such as FishBase, regard the taxon as a family within the suborder Scorpaenoidei, part of the Perciformes. The family name is derived from the genus name Neosebastes which is a compound of neo meaning "new" and Sebastes, as, when he coined the name, Alphonse Guichenot thought that the new genus was closely related to or was a subgenus of the genus Sebastes.

Genera
There are two genera which are classified in the Neosebastinae:

 Maxillicosta Whitley, 1935
 Neosebastes Guichenot, 1867

Characteristics
Neosebastinae, the gurnard perches, have a prominent head with large eyes and a large mouth. There are strong bony ridges and spines on the head and cheeks. Much of the body and head are covered in rough ctenoid scales. They have 13 long and robust venom bearing spines in the dorsal fin and 6-8 soft rays.

Distribution, habitat and biology
Neosebastinae are found in the eastern Indian Ocean and the western Pacific Ocean where they have an antiequatorial distribution in temperate and subtropical waters either side of the equator. They are benthic fishes living on soft substrates and feed on small fishes and crustaceans. They are oviparous, and, in at least N. pandus the females are larger than the males and the larger females have higher fecundity,

References

 
Ray-finned fish families